Sindhi Biryani is a special meat and rice biryani dish originating from the Sindh province of Pakistan. Owing to its popularity, it forms one of the most consumed dishes of Pakistani cuisine and Sindhi cuisine.

Ingredients
The following are the basic ingredients that are used in order to cook this famous Sindhi dish:

 Mutton or chicken or fish or shrimp
 Basmati rice
 Potatoes 
 Tomatoes
 Yogurt
 Red chili powder
 Salt
 Onions
 Turmeric
 Garlic
 Ginger
 Cardamom
 Black cardamom pods
 Cloves
 Black pepper
 Cumin seeds
 Cinnamon stick
 Bay leaves
 Oil
 Green chili peppers, Chili powder
  Coriander leaves
 Mint leaves
 Saffron
 Prunes

See also

 Riz gras
 Sindhi Pulao

References

Sindhi cuisine
Pakistani cuisine
Rice dishes
Pakistani meat dishes
Pakistani rice dishes
Cuisine of Karachi